The 1921 Heywood and Radcliffe by-election was held on 8 July 1921.  The by-election was held due to the elevation to the peerage of the incumbent Coalition Liberal MP, Albert Illingworth.  It was won by the Labour candidate Walter Halls.

References

Heywood and Radcliffe
Heywood and Radcliffe
1920s in Lancashire
Heywood and Radcliffe 1921
Heywood and Radcliffe 1921
Heywood and Radcliffe 1921